AutoAlliance Thailand (AAT) is the name of a joint venture automobile assembly firm co-owned by Ford and Mazda in Rayong province, Thailand. Modeled after the Ford-Mazda AutoAlliance International joint venture in the United States, AAT builds compact pickup trucks and SUVs primarily for the Southeast Asian market, with exports to Australia and other developing markets as well.

The factory in Thailand is designed to be similar to old Hofu plant, and is arranged as four squares.

History
Ford's sales in Thailand began in 1913 with the Model T, but it was only in 1961 that Ford began construction there. Anglo-Thai Motors Company, Ford’s distributor (which sold Ford Europe and Ford Australia products), announced in 1960 that it would build a factory in the country, with Thai Motor Company the result. This was the first time automobiles had been built in Thailand - Ford Cortinas were assembled locally using components shipped in from the UK. Mazda first began exporting utility vehicles to Thailand in 1950. In 1974 Sukosol & Mazda Motor Industry was founded, opening Mazda's first knock-down assembly plant in 1975.

Ford brought Thai Motor under the corporate umbrella in 1973, but closed the factory just three years later.  Company presence returned in 1985 with the formation of New Era Company to push cars and trucks in the country.

Construction on the new AutoAlliance plant began on November 28, 1995, and the plant began mass production on May 29, 1998.  The grand opening ceremony on July 1, 1998, was attended by Chuan Leekpai, the then-prime minister of Thailand.

Ford Thailand Manufacturing 
A separate second plant for Ford, Ford Thailand Manufacturing (FTM) was opened in 2012. Located 14 km from AAT, the new plant has a production capacity of 150,000 vehicles a year, boosting the annual Ford Thailand production capacity to 445,000 vehicles. The US$450 million (THB 15 billion) 750,000-square-meter assembly plant in Thailand is fully integrated to support body assembly, paint, trim and final assembly. Up to 85 percent of the plant’s production will be for markets outside Thailand. Initially, it produces passenger cars including Fiesta, Focus and EcoSport. The plant started manufacturing the Ranger in 2016, and ended the production of passenger cars in 2018. In December 2021, Ford announced it had invested $900 million to modernise both the Ford Thailand Manufacturing and AutoAlliance Thailand plants.

Products

Current production

AutoAlliance Thailand 
 Ford Ranger (1998–present)
 Ford Everest (March 2003–present)
 Mazda2 (2009–present)
 Mazda3 (2010–present)
 Mazda CX-3 (2015–present)
 Mazda CX-30 (2019–present)

Ford Thailand Manufacturing 
 Ford Ranger (2016–present)

Former production

AutoAlliance Thailand 
Mazda B-Series (1998–2006)
Ford Laser (2000–2002)
Mazda 323 Protégé (2000–2002)
Ford Fiesta (2010–2012)
Mazda BT-50 (2006–2020)
Ford Focus (2012–2018)

Ford Thailand Manufacturing 
Ford Fiesta (2012–2018)
Ford EcoSport (2014–2018)
Ford Focus (2005−2012)

References

External links

Ford factories
Mazda factories
Motor vehicle manufacturers of Thailand
Ford Motor Company
Joint ventures
Motor vehicle assembly plants in Thailand
1998 establishments in Thailand
Companies established in 1998
Car manufacturers of Thailand
Manufacturing companies based in Bangkok